"Strictly Business" is a song by EPMD from their debut album Strictly Business. Written and produced by the duo, "Strictly Business" became EPMD's second charting single, becoming a minor hit on the R&B charts. Although not a huge success when it was released, the song has since become a hip hop classic, making it onto several best hip hop songs lists.

Single track listing
"Strictly Business" (Vocal Mix)- 6:30
"Strictly Business" (Radio Mix)- 3:30
"Strictly Business" (Instrumental Mix)- 5:26
"Strictly Business" (Acapella)- 4:01

Charts

References

1988 singles
EPMD songs
Songs written by Erick Sermon
Songs written by PMD (rapper)
1988 songs
Songs written by Bob Marley
Sleeping Bag Records singles